Gay Rights Working Party was a working party (committee) of the Greater London Council (GLC), between 1981 and 1986 (when the GLC was abolished).

The working party was formed in 1976 to investigate gay issues in London. Its work culminated in the publication of Changing the world: a London charter for gay and lesbian rights. The party was particularly concerned with employment rights and police attitudes, and liaised with gay groups throughout the capital.

One of the important point of its activity was the forming of the Gay London Police Monitoring Group in 1982.

External links
 Gay Rights Working Party in The British Library of Political and Economic Science

Defunct LGBT organisations in the United Kingdom
LGBT organisations in London
Greater London Council
1981 establishments in England
1986 disestablishments in England
LGBT politics in the United Kingdom